The Samuel Jackson Jr. House is a historic house located at 137 Washington Street in Newton, Massachusetts.

Description and history 
The two-story wood-frame house was built c. 1768 by Samuel Jackson, the great-grandson of Edward Jackson, one of Newton's early settlers. The five-bay facade is typical of Federal style houses, as are the rear twin chimneys. The front porch, with its fluted columns, is a 19th-century addition, as are the sidelight windows flanking the front door.

The house was listed on the National Register of Historic Places on September 4, 1986.

See also
 National Register of Historic Places listings in Newton, Massachusetts

References

Houses on the National Register of Historic Places in Newton, Massachusetts
Federal architecture in Massachusetts